Karine Beauchard (born 27 November 1978) is a French mathematician known for her research in control theory. She is a University Professor at the École normale supérieure de Rennes, and was the Peccot Lecturer of the Collège de France for 2007–2008.

Education and career
From 1999 to 2003, Beauchard studied at the École normale supérieure Cachan. She earned her agrégation in 2002 and a Master of Advanced Studies in numerical analysis in 2003 through Pierre and Marie Curie University. She completed a doctorate in 2005 at the University of Paris-Sud; her dissertation, Contribution à l'étude de la contrôlabilité et la stabilisation de l'équation de Schrödinger, was directed by Jean-Michel Coron. She earned a habilitation in 2010 at Cachan, with a habilitation thesis on Analyse et contrôle de quelques équations aux dérivées partielles.

She worked at Cachan from 2005 to 2006, and as a chargée de recherche at CNRS from 2006 until 2014, when she took her present position as a professor at Rennes.

Recognition
Beauchard was the Peccot Lecturer of the Collège de France for 2007–2008, giving a course on the control of Schrödinger equations.
She became a junior member of the Institut Universitaire de France in 2018.

References

External links
Home page

Living people
20th-century French mathematicians
Women mathematicians
1978 births
21st-century French mathematicians